"I Don't Need It" is a song performed by R&B singer Jamie Foxx from his third studio album, Intuition. It features instrumental beats and additional vocals by Timbaland. The song was released as a radio-only single in May 2009.

Release and chart performance
The single was sent to US radio on May 6, 2009. It was initially supposed to gain a full release, but failed to get one due to Jamie Foxx needing to prepare for The Blame It Tour. It peaked at number 38 on the US Billboard Hot R&B/Hip-Hop Songs chart.

Charts

References

2008 songs
2009 singles
Jamie Foxx songs
Timbaland songs
Songs written by Timbaland
Song recordings produced by Timbaland
Songs written by Jim Beanz
Song recordings produced by Jerome "J-Roc" Harmon
Songs written by Jerome "J-Roc" Harmon
Songs written by James Fauntleroy